The Apertura 2014 Copa MX was the 72nd staging of the Copa MX, the 45th staging in the professional era and the fifth tournament played since the 1996–97 edition.

This tournament started on July 29, 2014 and concluded in November 2014.

Santos Laguna won their first title after defeating Puebla 4–2 on penalty kicks.

Participants Apertura 2014
This tournament featured the clubs from the Liga MX who did not participate in the 2014-15 CONCACAF Champions League (América, Cruz Azul, León and Pachuca) All 14 Ascenso MX teams also participated in the tournament.

Tiebreakers
If two or more clubs are equal on points on completion of the group matches, the following criteria are applied to determine the rankings:

 superior goal difference;
 higher number of goals scored;
 scores of the group matches played among the clubs in question;
 higher number of goals scored away in the group matches played among the clubs in question;
 best position in the Relegation table;
 fair play ranking;
 drawing of lots.

Group stage

Every group is composed by four clubs, two from Liga MX and two from Ascenso MX. Instead of a traditional robin-round schedule, the clubs will play in three two-legged "rounds", the last one being contested by clubs of the same league.

Each win gives a club 3 points, each draw gives 1 point. An extra point is awarded for every round won; a round is won by aggregated score, and if it is a tie, the extra point will be awarded to the team with higher number of goals scored away.

All times are UTC−06:00 except for matches in Sinaloa, Tepic (both UTC−07:00) and Tijuana (UTC−08:00)

Group 1

Round 1

Querétaro won the round 4−3 on aggregate

Tigres UANL won the round 5–3 on aggregate

Round 2

UANL won the round 3−2 on aggregate

Querétaro won the round 3−2 on aggregate

Round 3

Atlamira won the round 3−1 on aggregate

UANL won the round 2−0 on aggregate

Group 2

Round 1

Monterrey won the round 5–2 on aggregate

San Luis won the round 3–1 on aggregate

Round 2

Santos Laguna won the round 6–2 on aggregate

Monterrey won the round 2–1 on aggregate

Round 3

Santos Laguna won the round 5–3 on aggregate

San Luis won the round 7–3 on aggregate

Group 3

Round 1

Guadalajara and Tepic drew 4−4 on aggregate and both teams drew on away goals, thus neither team received the extra point

Tijuana won the round 4–3 on aggregate

Round 2

Teams drew 1–1 on aggregate, Tepic won the round on away goals

Guadalajara won the round 4–1 on aggregate

Round 3

The first leg originally ended 2–0 but Guadalajara was later awarded a 3–0 win after Tijuana only had 6 registered Liga MX players available for the leg instead of the mandatory 8.

Guadalajara won the round 3–1 on aggregate

Tepic won the round 4–0 on aggregate

Group 4

Round 1

Zacatecas and U. de G. drew 0−0 on aggregate and tied on away goals, thus both teams did not receive the extra point

Atlas won the round 6−4 on aggregate

Round 2

Atlas won the round 3−1 on aggregate

U. de G. won the round 3−2 on aggregate

Round 3

Sinaloa and Zacatecas drew 3−3 on aggregate and drew on away goals, thus neither team received the extra point

U. de G. won the round 4−2 on aggregate

Group 5

Round 1

Morelia and Necaxa drew 1–1 on aggregate and tied on away goals, thus neither team received the extra point

Puebla won the round 3–0 on aggregate

Round 2

Morelia won the round 5–2 on aggregate

Puebla won the round 1–0 on aggregate

Round 3

Morelia won the round 4–2 on aggregate

Necaxa won the round 4–1 on aggregate

Group 6

Round 1

Mérida won the round 3–2 on aggregate

UNAM won the round 4–3 on aggregate

Round 2

Toluca won the round 6–2 on aggregate

Mérida won the round 4–2 on aggregate

Round 3

Mérida won the round 2–1 on aggregate

Toluca won the round 4–3 on aggregate

Group 7

Round 1

Lobos BUAP won the round 4−2 on aggregate

Veracruz and Oaxaca drew 4−4 on aggregate, Veracruz won the round on away goals

Round 2

Oaxaca won the round 2−0 on aggregate

Teams drew 1−1 on aggregate, Veracruz won the round on away goals

Round 3

BUAP won the round 4−3 on aggregate

Chiapas won the round 4−3 on aggregate

Ranking of runners-up clubs

The best runner-up advances to the Championship Stage. If two or more teams are equal on points on completion of the group matches, the following criteria are applied to determine the rankings:

 superior goal difference;
 higher number of goals scored;
 higher number of goals scored away;
 best position in the Relegation table;
 fair play ranking;
 drawing of lots.

Championship stage

The eight clubs that advance to this stage will be ranked and seeded 1 to 8. In case of ties, the same tiebreakers used to rank the runners-up will be used.

In this stage, all the rounds will be a one-off match. If the game ends in a tie, there will proceed to penalty shootouts directly.

The venue will be determined as follows:

The highest seeded club will host the match, regardless of the division the clubs are in.

Seeding

Bracket

Quarterfinals

Semifinals

Final

Top goalscorers
Players and teams in bold are still active in the competition

Source: LigaMX.net

References

External links
 Official page of Copa MX (as well as Liga MX and Ascenso MX)

2014, 1
Copa Mx, 1
Copa Mx, 1